Újpest-városkapu (lit. Újpest-City Gate) is a station on the Budapest Metro Line 3 (North-South). The station was opened on 14 December 1990 as part of the extension from Árpád híd.

It primarily serves the extreme southwest corner of Újpest district, northwest Angyalföld and several northern suburbs through the bus terminal, railway station (commuter rail to Esztergom) and park and ride lot, located over the station.

Connections
Bus: 104, 104A, 121, 122, 196, 196A, 204
Regional buses: 300, 302, 303, 305, 308, 309, 310, 312, 313, 314, 315, 316, 318, 319, 320, 321, 872, 880, 882, 883, 884, 889, 890, 893
Rail: Újpest stop on Budapest–Esztergom suburban line (S72, G72 and Z72, S76 to Piliscsaba/Rákos lines)

References

M3 (Budapest Metro) stations
Railway stations opened in 1990